Matthew Frederick Monro (born 21 February 1964) is a British singer.  The son of Matt Monro, he often performs his father's work.

In 1977, when Monro junior was 13, he was invited by his father to join him on stage to perform a duet.

When he signed with EMI in 1995, modern technology enabled him to sing with his father again. The album, Matt Sings Monro, is a collection of Matt Monro songs, rearranged as duets featuring Monro junior and senior.

In 2005, he toured England with a new show, The Legend Lives On which was a year in the making and took him to over 40 concert venues across England. He toured the same show in 2006. In the last few years, he has been working with his late father's musical director, Colin Keyes.

References

1964 births
Living people
English male singers